Carex arctata, known as drooping woodland sedge, is a species of sedge native to eastern North America.  It is sometimes called black sedge, compressed sedge, or drooping wood sedge. It occurs from Manitoba to the Maritimes in Canada, south to northwestern North Carolina, and west to Minnesota. Carex arctata grows in bogs, hardwood forests, and spruce forests.

Taxonomy
Carex arctata part of the section Carex sect. Hymenochlaenae. It was first formally named by Francis Boott in 1839.

Carex arctata and Carex castanea (chestnut sedge, also in C. sect. Hymenochlaenae) form a hybrid known as Carex × knieskernii (Knieskern's sedge).

Conservation
It is endangered in several states: Indiana, Ohio, and New Jersey.

References

arctata
Flora of North America